
Gmina Miłki is a rural gmina (administrative district) in Giżycko County, Warmian-Masurian Voivodeship, in northern Poland.

Villages
Gmina Miłki contains the villages and settlements of Bielskie, Borki, Czyprki, Danowo, Jagodne Małe, Jagodne Wielkie, Jedamki, Kąp, Kleszczewo, Kleszczewo-Osada, Konopki Małe, Konopki Wielkie, Lipińskie, Lipowy Dwór, Marcinowa Wola, Miechy, Miłki, Paprotki, Przykop, Ruda, Rydzewo, Staświny, Staświny-Osada, Wierciejki and Wyszowate.

Neighbouring gminas
Gmina Miłki is bordered by the gminas of Giżycko, Mikołajki, Orzysz, Ryn and Wydminy.

References
Polish official population figures 2006

Milki
Giżycko County